Marcos Gondra Krug (born 1 January 1987) is a Spanish footballer who currently plays for Hong Kong Premier League club Eastern.

Club career
In August 2013, Gondra signed for 2. divisjon side Moss FK alongside fellow Spaniard Jorge Rodriguez. In January 2014, Gondra extended his stay at Moss for the 2014 season. For the 2015 season, Gondra joined fellow 2. Divisjon side Raufoss IL.

After spells at FC Isola Capo Rizzuto in the Italian Serie D and FK Gjøvik-Lyn in Norway, Gondra joined Hong Kong Premier League club Dreams on 13 July 2018. He left the club on 31 May 2019 after one season.

On 1 June 2019, it was reported that Gondra would join fellow Hong Kong club Pegasus. The relationship between player and club quickly deteriorated, culminating in mutual termination of his contract on 6 January 2020. Pegasus claimed that Gondra would often ask to withdraw from the starting lineup due to injury at the last minute, however, the club would be forced to play him in spite of this due to lack of advance notice. 

Gondra then returned to Spain and signed with Gernika Club. He played for the club for one year, before he signed with Lorca Deportiva at the end of December 2020.

On 14 September 2021, Gondra returned to Hong Kong and joined Eastern.

Career statistics

Club

References

External links

1987 births
Living people
People from Busturialdea
Spanish footballers
Footballers from the Basque Country (autonomous community)
Association football midfielders
Athletic Bilbao footballers
Deportivo Alavés players
Deportivo Alavés B players
Club Portugalete players
CF Atlético Ciudad players
CD Santurtzi players
Syrianska FC players
Moss FK players
Raufoss IL players
Dreams Sports Club players
TSW Pegasus FC players
Eastern Sports Club footballers
Gernika Club footballers
CF Lorca Deportiva players
Segunda División B players
Tercera División players
Allsvenskan players
Norwegian First Division players
Norwegian Second Division players
Serie D players
Hong Kong Premier League players
Spanish expatriate footballers
Spanish expatriate sportspeople in Sweden
Spanish expatriate sportspeople in Norway
Spanish expatriate sportspeople in Italy
Spanish expatriate sportspeople in Hong Kong
Expatriate footballers in Sweden
Expatriate footballers in Norway
Expatriate footballers in Italy
Expatriate footballers in Hong Kong
Hong Kong League XI representative players
Sportspeople from Biscay